Saint-Rémy-la-Varenne is a former commune in the Maine-et-Loire department in western France. On 15 December 2016, it was merged into the new commune Brissac Loire Aubance. Its population was 946 in 2019.

See also
Communes of the Maine-et-Loire department

References

Saintremylavarenne